Orthoclydon pseudostinaria is a species of moth in the family Geometridae. It is endemic to New Zealand. It is classified as critically endangered by the Department of Conservation.

Taxonomy
This species was first described by George Vernon Hudson in 1918 under the name Xanthorhoe pseudostinaria. Hudson subsequently placed the species within the genus Orthoclydon.

Description
Hudson described the species as follows:

Distribution
Orthoclydon pseudostinaria is endemic to New Zealand. Hudson first collected the species at Otira. The moth was subsequently also found to be present at Gouland Downs near Nelson as well as in the Nelson district, Mount Grey and White Rock in Canterbury.

Plant hosts
The plant host of O. pseudostinaria is unknown. Given the rarity of the moth species it has been hypothesized that the host plant is also uncommon.

Conservation status
In 1928 Hudson regarded this species as being very rare and this moth is now classified under the New Zealand Threat Classification system as being Nationally Critical.

References

Moths of New Zealand
Moths described in 1918
Cidariini
Endemic fauna of New Zealand
Taxa named by George Hudson
Endangered biota of New Zealand
Endemic moths of New Zealand